The Kokun River, also spelled Kokon River or Kokan River, is a river in Madang Province, Papua New Guinea.

The Kokan languages, Girawa and Kein (Bemal), are spoken in the area.

See also
List of rivers of Papua New Guinea
Kokun River languages

References

Rivers of Papua New Guinea